The discography of Swedish singer Nanne Grönvall consists of 11 albums. Grönvall is a former member of Sound of Music and Peter's Pop Squad and a current member of One More Time.

Studio albums

Sound of Music

One More Time

Solo albums

Singles

Sound of Music

Peter's Pop Squad

One More Time

 Radio/promo only

Solo singles

 Radio/promo only
 Digital release only

Other songs
 Stilla natt on the En nygammal jul Christmas album (2002)

References 

Discographies of Swedish artists
Pop music discographies